Alexander Walter Kreiser Jr (May 5, 1901 – February 7, 1993) was a Naval Aviator and a brigadier general who served in the United States Marine Corps.

Alexander Kreiser graduated from United States Naval Academy with a Bachelor of Science 1920–1924, he excelled in the engineering club at West High School Minneapolis, Minnesota and was accepted by Marion Military Institute in 1919.

Early Marine Corps career

He became a company officer of Smedley Butler's 3rd Brigade China Marines from 1927 to 1929 and a Quantico  Aviation pioneer of Marine Fighting Squadron Nine (VF-9M). Kreiser's early Quantico Marine (VF-9M) squadrons performed in many National Air Races in the United States. He received the Yangtze Service Medal in China during the Nanking Incident in 1927 and the Nicaragua Medal of Merit for his service as a combat pilot during the second United States occupation of Nicaragua.

Marine aviator — 1930s
By the mid 1930s, Alexander Kreiser was assigned to the U.S. Navy's Bureau of Aeronautics as a captain and served as assistant command of the director of Marine Corps Aviation Ross E. Rowell before being assigned, to the Naval Air Station North Island at Coronado, California, in June 1939.

World War II; 1940s
During World War II, Kreiser was a pilot in the 1st Marine Aircraft Wing and he earned a second Bronze Star Medal in the Solomon Islands campaign.

1950s — Commands, Assistant Commandant
Colonel Alexander W. Kreiser Jr was second in Command of the 1st Marine Aircraft Wing. BGen Clayton C. Jerome took over command of the wing in April 1952 from Major General MGen Christian F. Schilt while Col. A.W. Kreiser relieved BGen Frank Lamson-Scribner as assistant commanding general of the 1st Marine Aircraft Wing. in August 1952

References

1901 births
1993 deaths
Aviators from Minnesota
United States Marine Corps generals
United States Marine Corps personnel of the Korean War
United States Marine Corps pilots of World War II
Recipients of the Legion of Merit
United States Naval Aviators
United States Naval Academy alumni
Air Corps Tactical School alumni
Marion Military Institute alumni
American military personnel of the Banana Wars